Eric Campbell (born August 22, 1977) is an American former professional basketball player. He played college basketball for Spring Hill College.

Career
Campbell began his professional career in 1999 in Israel with Elitzur Kiryat Ata, and played there three seasons. From 2002 to 2005 he played with Ironi Nahariya. In 2005, Campbell signed with Le Mans Sarthe Basket. With them he played for the first time in the Euroleague in the 2006–07 season, and was named MVP of week 2.

In 2007–08 he played with Hapoel Holon. In summer 2008, Campbell signed with ASVEL Villeurbanne, and stayed there for two seasons. In January 2011, he returned to Israel and signed with Hapoel Holon, but played only five games, then signed with Orléans Loiret Basket. In January 2012, he signed with Elitzur Netanya, and stayed there till the end of the season.

References

External links
 Euroleague profile
 French league profile

1977 births
Living people
African-American basketball players
American expatriate basketball people in France
American expatriate basketball people in Israel
American men's basketball players
ASVEL Basket players
Basketball players from Alabama
Elitzur Kiryat Ata players
Elitzur Maccabi Netanya B.C. players
Hapoel Holon players
Ironi Nahariya players
Le Mans Sarthe Basket players
Orléans Loiret Basket players
People from Thomasville, Alabama
Shooting guards
Spring Hill Badgers men's basketball players
21st-century African-American sportspeople
20th-century African-American sportspeople